The CU Buffoons (sometimes stylized as BUFFoons) is the oldest collegiate a cappella group at the University of Colorado-Boulder, founded in 1962 by Dr. Oakleigh Thorne II with help from Don Grusin and Roger Nelson. The group consists of 12-18 undergraduate students, with new members being auditioned at the start of every fall semester. With arranging being done in house by current and former group members, their repertoire consists of covers of pieces from a wide variety of musical genres, including jazz, rock, RnB, pop, and even show tunes.

The group has been recognized over the years in differing ways, having the privilege of serving as Colorado Music Ambassadors in their early years, and most recently being featured on both the Voices Only and Best of College A Cappella compilation albums in 2012 and 2013 respectively for their cover of Down the Line's 2010 song "The Great Debate". The group was also featured on the 2009 album Ben Folds Presents: University A Cappella!, produced by Folds, performing a cover of his song "Landed". The group performs across the Colorado Front Range, occasionally traveling out of the state to tour or collaborate with other collegiate groups.

About the Group

History 
In June 1954, Dr. Oakleigh "Oak" Thorne (the previous musical director, or "pitchpipe", of the Yale Whiffenpoofs) moved to Boulder to receive his doctorate in Biology at the University of Colorado. The Whiffenpoofs, founded in 1909, are the oldest a Cappella group in the nation. In 1961, after a performance in Denver for the Yale Association, Thorne brought the Whiffenpoofs to Macky Auditorium on CU's campus to sing. When Thorne introduced the group he suggested that someone should start an a Cappella group on CU's campus as well. When asked later why he pushed the student body to take up the style and create a group, Thorne stated, ""I thought the sounds of a cappella without any instruments was such a great sound. I just wanted to see it established out here in the West."

A year later, the Whiffenpoofs were brought back to Boulder by Thorne, and again he challenged the audience to start their own collegiate group. Shortly after the concert, Don Grusin and Roger Nelson, two CU undergraduates, approached Oak to ask if he could help them start such a group. Delighted, Oak provided guidance and arrangements for the singers. By September 1962, the three musicians had formed an octet under the name "The BUFFoons," a reference to the university mascot, Ralphie the Buffalo. The name was eventually re-stylized to simply “Buffoons”, dropping the capitalization.

Since then, the group has gone on to record over a dozen studio albums, most recently releasing their first Christmas offering, Christmas Love, in 2019. Being one of the oldest groups in the area, they've fostered positive relationships within the Boulder community and across Colorado, having the opportunity to perform for the governor several times and singing the National Anthem prior to Colorado Rockies games on a near yearly basis.

Despite being self-labeled as an “all-male” group for the majority of their existence, in 2020 the group re-branded to be more inclusive, now identifying as a “tenor/bass” group, and has opened up the audition process to anyone in that particular vocal range, welcoming their first female member in 2021.

Traditions 
Over the years the Buffoons have started and maintained a number of traditions and rituals that serve as both rites of passage and platforms for which their brotherhood can truly be fostered.

Tribute 
In the 1980’s, with group membership on the decline, Jojo Davis, a current member at the time, set out to make his mark on the group and attempt to rekindle what was seriously considered to be a dead group. The result was Tribute, a short song he dedicated to the friends he'd made so far during his tenure, but also to those who came before him and, hopefully, those still to come. With Davis’ passing in the mid 1990’s, the song suddenly took on a whole new meaning and importance to the group. Tribute is still sung as a closer for every concert the group puts on, with the current members asking all past Buffoons to join in the singing on stage, showing off the legacy that the Buffoons have and continue to create.

Arches 
Beginning in the late 90’s, a few members began dropping by the University Memorial Center plaza immediately after rehearsals to give a short performance for anyone passing by. As time passed, and more members became aware of the on-going biweekly shows, the group grew until it became a named event; Arches. Continuing on to the present, the group now regularly streams their late evening performances as a way for their fans to interact even while being from places other than Boulder. Other University of Colorado-Boulder groups have recently begun joining in the show as a way to strengthen the a cappella community at the school.

Music 
Since 1962, the groups repertoire has expanded to include covers of songs from nearly every imaginable genre of music. Beginning with a set of jazz standards and old folk tunes, the group quickly found that as time passed, not only were the songs getting old after continuous rehearsal and performance, but they were entering a new age of sound. Rock was now the popular music of the time, and with it came more arrangements in that genre. Moving on to RnB, alternative, country, and modern pop, the group now boasts over 100 unique arrangements, of which about 20 are in consistent rotation for performances.

The group has consistently recorded and released music over the decades, usually sticking to a schedule putting out an album every 3–4 years. While their early work featured many repeat recordings and many instances of completely live vocals as their repertoire slowly expanded and a cappella music in general became more mainstream, the Buffoons contemporary albums have seen a much more varied structure, both in length and mixing. Vocal percussion has become a large part of the group’s sound, with a full time vocal percussionist being added for the first time in 2021.

The group also enjoys collaborating with other musical acts, including CU’s annual Acapalooza event which brings together all 7 of the CU-Boulder a cappella groups for a single festival with performances from every group.

Discography

Albums 

 Songs by the CU BUFFoons, 1963 (LP)
 Quit’cha, 1965 (LP)
 For You, 1967 (LP)
 Those Magnificent Men, 1969 (LP)
 Colorado Trail, 1976 (LP)
 Live at Tulagi, 1978 (LP)
 Hangin’ On, 1982 (LP)
 Happy Hour, 1995 (CD)
 Fine Malt A’Cappella, 1998 (CD)
 No Time for Love, 2002 (CD)
 So They Say, 2005 (CD)
 A Night at the Zoo, 2007 (CD)
 Bell Time, 2010 (CD)
 Under the Arches, 2012 (CD)
 Songs from the Grove, 2015 (CD)
 Christmas Love, 2019 (CD)

Featured on 

 Ben Folds Presents: University A Cappella!, 2009 (CD), “Landed"
 Voices Only 2012 College A Cappella, 2012 (CD), “The Great Debate"
 BOCA 2013: Best of College A Cappella, 2013 (CD), “The Great Debate"

Notable Alumni 

 Dr. Oakleigh “Oak” Thorne II: founder, conservationist
 Don Grusin: founder, American jazz musician and record producer 
 Roger Nelson: founder
 Jojo Davis: writer of “Tribute"
 Mike Houston: American actor 
 David Bashford: American music producer and songwriter
 Spence Hood: American singer/songwriter

References 

Collegiate a cappella groups
University of Colorado Boulder
1962 establishments in Colorado